Róbert Valenta (born 10 January 1990) is a Slovak football midfielder who currently plays for the Slovak club FC Pata.

Career
On 5 March 2019, Valenta joined FC Pata.

References

External links
Zbrojovka profile 

1990 births
Living people
Sportspeople from Šaľa
Slovak footballers
Association football midfielders
FC Nitra players
AC Sparta Prague players
FC Zbrojovka Brno players
1. FK Příbram players
FC DAC 1904 Dunajská Streda players
FC ViOn Zlaté Moravce players
Slovak Super Liga players
Czech First League players
Slovak expatriate footballers
Slovak expatriate sportspeople in the Czech Republic
Expatriate footballers in the Czech Republic